The University of the Philippines Press (or the U.P. Press) is the official publishing house for all constituent units of the U.P. system, and is the first university press in the country.  It is mandated to encourage, publish, and disseminate scholarly, creative, and scientific works that represent distinct contributions to knowledge in various academic disciplines, which commercial publishers would not ordinarily undertake to publish.  Its main office is located at the University of the Philippines Diliman.  It is currently headed by poet, critic and literary scholar J. Neil Garcia.

University of the Philippines
University of the Philippines Diliman
University presses of the Philippines
Book publishing companies of the Philippines
Publishing companies established in 1965
Companies based in Quezon City